The 1937 South American Basketball Championship was the 5th edition of this tournament.  It was held in Valparaíso and Santiago, Chile and won by the host, Chile national basketball team.  A record 5 teams competed, including Peru in their first appearance.

Final rankings

Results

Each team played the other four teams twice apiece, for a total of eight games played by each team and 20 overall in the tournament.

External links

FIBA.com archive for SAC1937

1937
S
B
Champ
1937 in Chilean sport
March 1937 sports events
Sport in Valparaíso Region
Valparaíso
1930s in Santiago, Chile
Sports competitions in Santiago